Harold Robson (1897 – after 1926) was an English footballer who played in the Football League for Stoke City.

Career
Robson was born in Gateshead and played amateur football with Usworth Colliery. In 1925 he joined Stoke City and played one match for the "Potters" which came in a 5–1 defeat away at Wolverhampton Wanderers on 20 February 1925. After this awful start he never played for the club again.

Career statistics

References

1897 births
Year of death missing
Footballers from Gateshead
Association football defenders
English footballers
Usworth Colliery A.F.C. players
Stoke City F.C. players
Southport F.C. players
English Football League players